Camila Antonia Amaranta Vallejo Dowling (born 28 April 1988) is a Chilean communist politician and former student leader who has been serving as Minister General Secretariat of Government since 11 March 2022. Previously, Vallejo served as a member of the Chamber of Deputies, representing District 26 of La Florida, Santiago.

As president of the University of Chile Student Federation (FECh) and as the main spokesperson of the Confederation of Chilean Students (Confech), Vallejo rose to prominence during the student protests of 2011. Described as "the world's most glamorous revolutionary" by The New York Times Magazine, Vallejo has been deemed the most influential communist figure in 21st-century Chile, and has been described as the symbolic successor to Gladys Marín former deputy.

Biography

Early life 
Vallejo is the daughter of Reinaldo Vallejo and Mariela Dowling, both members of Communist Party of Chile and activists in the Chilean resistance during the military dictatorship of Augusto Pinochet. Reinaldo Vallejo owned an air conditioning business, while Mariela Dowling was a homemaker.

She spent her childhood between the communes of Macul and La Florida, and attended Colegio Raimapu, a private school in La Florida. In 2006, Vallejo entered the University of Chile to study geography. There, she started forming ties with leftist students and became involved in politics, which led her to join the Chilean Communist Youth the following year. Vallejo graduated as geographer in July 2013.

Student leader 

Vallejo was counselor of FECh in 2008, and was chosen as its president in November 2010, becoming only the second woman to hold this post in the 105-year history of the student union.

Vallejo has acquired public attention as a leading spokesperson and as leader of the 2011 student protests in Chile, alongside other student leaders, including Giorgio Jackson from the Catholic University of Chile Student Federation and Camilo Ballesteros from the University of Santiago, Chile Student Federation. In August 2011, the Supreme Court of Chile ordered police protection for Vallejo after she received death threats. In October 2011 she was elected to the Central Committee of the Communist Youth of Chile at its XIII National Congress.

On 7 December 2011, Vallejo was defeated in her bid for re-election by Gabriel Boric, a law school graduate; Boric would later appoint her to his Presidential Cabinet after becoming President of Chile in March 2022. Despite not being the president of the FECh any longer, Vallejo continued to appear consistently in the media to defend the student movement and the rights of workers.

Deputy 

In November 2012, Vallejo was proclaimed by the Communist Party of Chile as one of their candidates for Congress in the 2013 elections. Although in January 2012 Vallejo had stated that she would "never be willing to campaign" in favor of Michelle Bachelet, she changed her position after the Communist Party decided to offer its support to Socialist presidential pre-candidate. Later she stated that "it was not an easy decision." Vallejo and Bachelet first met at a campaign event on 15 June 2013.

After Chile's national elections of 17 November 2013, Vallejo was elected to represent District 26 of La Florida with more than 43 percent of the votes, one of the highest victory margins of that election. Vallejo was joined in Congress with other fellow student leaders, including Giorgio Jackson, Gabriel Boric and Karol Cariola, who formed the so-called "student bench". The deputies were very active in debates related to the educational reforms proposed by the second government of Michelle Bachelet.

Vallejo has made anti-Zionist remarks during her political career. In 2016 she called Israel "a terrorist State that seeks the displacement and extermination of Palestinians," and that the "Palestinian–Israeli conflict does not constitute a war, but a genocide." She stated that "[t]his is not about antisemitism ... I emphatically condemn ... the impunity of a Zionist project that violates all international law, that seeks to oppress and exterminate a brother nation."

Vallejo became a prominent figure as deputy and was re-elected in the 2017 general election. During her term as deputy, she pàrticipated mainly in the commissions of Education and Gender Equality. She was one of the main promoters of the legislation to reduce the working hours to 40 hours per week.

For the 2021 presidential election, Vallejo was a supporter of Communist Party nominee Daniel Jadue and was intimately involved in his campaign to win the nomination of Apruebo Dignidad, the left-wing coalition created by the Communist Party, the Broad Front and other movements. She was described as his campaign spokesperson by several sources. After Jadue lost the primary election to Gabriel Boric, Vallejo became one of the leaders of Boric's campaign.

Minister Secretary General of Government 
After Gabriel Boric was elected president, Camila Vallejo was named in charge of the Ministry General Secretariat of Government and, in that role, she is the official spokesperson of the Boric government. She assumed the office on 11 March 2022, along President Boric and the rest of his cabinet.

Recognition 
Vallejo has been labeled by the media as the most important and influential Communist personality of the 21st century in Chile, and also as the symbolic successor of Gladys Marín. In August 2011, she was displayed on the front page of the German weekly Die Zeit and in December of that year she was overwhelmingly chosen as "Person of the Year" in an online poll by readers of The Guardian, which four months earlier had published a piece on her. Vallejo has been included by magazines in such lists as "100 People Who Mattered" by Time in its December 2011 "Time Person of the Year" annual issue, and in "150 Fearless Women" by Newsweek in March 2012. In 2012, a collection of her writings, Podemos Cambiar el Mundo ("We Can Change the World") was published in Spanish.

Some have been more negative. Historian Gabriel Salazar sparked controversy by stating in an interview with newspaper El Mercurio de Calama that Vallejo should quit the Communist Party if she was "intelligent enough". He also stated that she had become the new caudillo of the Communist Party.

In August 2013, the Omaha-based political punk band Desaparecidos released the song "Te amo Camilla Vallejo" saluting Vallejo's role in the Student Movement. The track was later released on Desaparecidos' 2015 LP Payola.

Personal life 

In April 2013, it was made public that Vallejo was expecting her first child with Julio Sarmiento, one of the heads of the Communist Youth of Chile and her partner since September 2011. On 6 October 2013, she gave birth to a baby girl. In 2016, it became public that Vallejo and Sarmiento had broken up and that she was in a relationship with musician Abel Zicavo.

See also 
 Leaders of the 2011 Chilean protests
 2011 student protests in Chile
 Education in Chile

References

External links 

1988 births
Living people
Anti-corporate activists
Anti-Zionism in South America
Chilean atheists
Chilean communists
Chilean Marxists
Chilean people of English descent
Chilean people of Spanish descent
Communist Party of Chile politicians
21st-century Chilean women politicians
People from Santiago
Presidents of the University of Chile Student Federation
Members of the Chamber of Deputies of Chile
Women members of the Chamber of Deputies of Chile
University of Chile alumni